Hōjō Yasutoki (1183 – July 14, 1242) was the third shikken (regent) of the Kamakura shogunate in Japan. He strengthened the political system of the Hōjō regency.

Life 
He was the eldest son of second shikken Hōjō Yoshitoki. According to Azuma Kagami, he was liked by the first shōgun, Minamoto no Yoritomo. In 1218, he became the chief (bettō) of the Board of Retainers (samurai-dokoro).

In the Jōkyū War of 1221, he led shogunate forces against the imperial court in Kyoto. After his victory, he remained in Kyoto and set up the Rokuhara Tandai. Yasutoki and his uncle Tokifusa became the first tandai.

When his father Yoshitoki and aunt Hōjō Masako died, he succeeded to become shikken in 1224. He installed Hōjō Tokifusa as the first rensho. In 1225 he created the Hyōjō, the council system of the shogunate. In 1232 he promulgated the Goseibai Shikimoku, the legal code of the shogunate. He was highly praised for his impartial justice.

In 1242, he was ordained as a Buddhist monk and took the Dharma name Jōshōbō Kan'a (上聖房観阿).

He died in the same year. His grandson Tsunetoki succeeded him to the post of shikken.

References

External links

1183 births
1242 deaths
Yasutoki
Regents of Japan
People of Heian-period Japan
People of Kamakura-period Japan
Kamakura period Buddhist clergy